Denis George Mahan (born June 15, 1950), better known as Deney Terrio, is an American choreographer and hosted the television musical variety series Dance Fever from 1979 to 1985.

Early life and career
Raised in Titusville, Florida, Terrio achieved fame as the dance coach and choreographer for John Travolta in the movie Saturday Night Fever. During his heyday with Dance Fever, he appeared in a number of films, including The Idolmaker, Star Trek II: The Wrath of Khan, A Night in Heaven and Knights of the City and guest starred on popular television series of the time including The Love Boat. Throughout the 1990s, he toured nightclubs, performing with Motion and judging dance contests.

Recent years
Terrio has appeared on several VH1 specials and co-hosted the 2004 PBS special Get Down Tonight: The Disco Explosion which featured many popular disco artists from the 1970s and actress Karen Lynn Gorney. During the show, Terrio and Gorney danced to Tavares’ live performance of “More Than a Woman”, as Gorney had with John Travolta in Saturday Night Fever.

Currently, Terrio is hosting his own disco radio show on the Sirius Satellite Radio network and is a choreographer and competitor at regional Dancing with the Stars competitions.

In 1991, he sued Merv Griffin, the producer of Dance Fever, for sexual harassment; the US$11.3 million case was later dismissed.
In 2015, Terrio sued the toy company Hasbro in a federal court for creating an animated gecko and toy figurine named Vinnie Terrio. He alleged that his publicity rights were violated by the gecko and figurine. In February 2016, Terrio and Hasbro settled Terrio's claims out of court.

In popular culture
Terrio was referred to in the Steve Martin movie Dirty Rotten Scoundrels, in which Martin's character, a con man and hustler named Freddy Benson, poses as a crippled veteran as part of a plan to extract money from a rich woman. In order to induce her pity, Benson claims that he lost use of his legs after he found his girlfriend having sex with Terrio.
In the final episode of season 1 of Modern Family, Claire tells Phil he looks like Deney Terrio. Jay then spouts off that Deney Terrio was a 1970s disco dancer from Ohio. Obviously he was wrong about the Ohio part.

In Eddie Murphy’s classic standup special, ‘Raw’, Eddie makes a joke referencing an encounter with Terrio, prompting his father to inquire as to why he was with Terrio in the first place.

References

External links 
 

American choreographers
American male film actors
American game show hosts
Living people
1950 births
Film choreographers
People from Titusville, Florida